Trémery is a commune in the Moselle department in Grand Est in north-eastern France.

Economy
 Usine PSA de Trémery (PSA factory of Trémery), the biggest diesel engine factory in the world.

Notable citizens
Jean-Marie Pirot, known as Arcabas, contemporary sacred artist.

See also
 Communes of the Moselle department

References

External links
 

Communes of Moselle (department)